Mork & Mindy/Laverne & Shirley/Fonz Hour is a 1982–1983 American animated television series produced by Hanna-Barbera Productions and Ruby-Spears Enterprises in association with Paramount Television, featuring animated versions of characters from the live-action sitcoms Mork & Mindy, Laverne & Shirley and Happy Days (Fonzie), all part of the same franchise. This Saturday morning series lasted for one season on ABC.

This show was divided into two segments: Mork & Mindy and Laverne & Shirley with the Fonz. The Laverne & Shirley half-hour was the second season of Laverne & Shirley in the Army, with the addition of The Fonz and his dog Mr. Cool from the earlier cartoon The Fonz and the Happy Days Gang.

Mork & Mindy 
In the Mork & Mindy segment, in which Robin Williams and Pam Dawber voiced the title characters, a teenaged Mork is sent to Earth from planet Ork to observe the lives of human teenagers and enroll in a local school. As on the original show, Mindy McConnell and her father Fred (voiced by Conrad Janis) are the only Earthlings who know that he is an alien and he sends telepathic reports of his experiences to Orkan ruler Orson (voiced by an uncredited Ralph James). Unlike the original show, Mork is accompanied by his Orkan pet, a pink, six-legged dog-like creature named Doing (voiced by Frank Welker) which is pronounced as "Doyng". Other characters in the show included Eugene (voiced by Shavar Ross), Hamilton (voiced by Mark L. Taylor), and Principal Caruthers (voiced by an uncredited Stanley Jones).

Episode list

Cast 
 Robin Williams - Mork
 Pam Dawber - Mindy McConnell
 Conrad Janis - Frederick McConnell
 Ralph James - Orson
 Stan Jones - Principal Caruthers
 Shavar Ross - Eugene
 Mark L. Taylor - Hamilton
 Frank Welker - Doing

Laverne & Shirley with The Fonz 
This segment is a continuation of Laverne & Shirley in the Army, the only difference being the addition of The Fonz (voiced by Henry Winkler) and his dog Mr. Cool (voiced by Frank Welker; from The Fonz and the Happy Days Gang) as mechanics in the army camp's motor pool. Cindy Williams quit her role as Shirley on the live-action sitcom Laverne & Shirley in August 1982. Conversely, Williams' role in the animated series was taken over by friend Lynne Marie Stewart. Only eight episodes were produced. Thus, the existing segments produced up to that point were rerun for the rest of the series. Except for a few publicity cel paintings, no further plans for the series were made.

Episode list

Cast 
 Penny Marshall - Laverne DeFazio
 Henry Winkler - Arthur "Fonzie"/"The Fonz" Fonzarelli
 Lynne Marie Stewart - Shirley Feeney
 Kenneth Mars - Sgt. Turnbuckle
 Ron Palillo - Sgt. 
 Frank Welker - Mr. Cool

References

External links 
 
 The show's opening on YouTube
 The Mork & Mindy / Laverne & Shirley / Fonz Hour at Toonarific.com
 Episode index at the Big Cartoon DataBase

1982 American television series debuts
1983 American television series endings
1980s American animated television series
American animated television spin-offs
American children's animated comedy television series
American children's animated fantasy television series
English-language television shows
Television series by CBS Studios
Television series by Hanna-Barbera
Television series by Ruby-Spears
Happy Days